Diboll High School is a public high school located in Diboll, Texas, USA and classified as a 3A school by the UIL. It is part of the Diboll Independent School District located in central Angelina County. In 2015, the school was rated "Met Standard" by the Texas Education Agency.

Athletics
The school mascot (appropriate for the town's major industry of forestry) is the lumberjack (lady jack for female teams).

The Diboll Lumberjacks compete in these sports - 

Baseball
Basketball
Cross Country
Football
Golf
Powerlifting
Soccer
Softball
Tennis
Track and Field
Volleyball

State Titles
Girls Track - 
1984(3A)

Clubs and Organizations

Diboll High School participates in the following activities -
   
UIL Academics
Academic Decathlon
Debate
Drug Free All-Stars
FCCLA
Future Farmers of America
Gear Up
Health Science
Interact Club
Mock Trial
National Honor Society
Smash Club
Spanish Club
Student Council

Notable alumni
 Jermichael Finley - American football tight end for the NFL Green Bay Packers.

References

External links
Diboll ISD
Diboll Athletics

Schools in Angelina County, Texas
Public high schools in Texas